Alpha Oumar Sow may refer to:

 Alpha Oumar Sow (Guinean footballer) (born 1997)
 Alpha Oumar Sow (Senegalese footballer) (born 1984)